Chop is a city located in Zakarpattia Oblast (province) of western Ukraine, near the borders of Slovakia and Hungary. It is separated from the Hungarian town of Záhony by the river Tisza by being situated on its right bank. Located inside Uzhhorod Raion, since 2003 it is designated as a city of oblast significance – not included in any raion (district) of the oblast.

Toponymy

History

Like the rest of Transcarpathia, Csap (as it was then known) was part of Hungary until 1920, when, as a result of the post-World War I Treaty of Trianon, it was included in the newly created Czechoslovakia, where it belonged to Slovakia, not to Subcarpathian Rus. During World War II, under the First Vienna Award, it briefly became Hungarian again. But, after the war, as part of the Czechoslovakia–Soviet Union relations, it became part of the expanded Ukrainian Soviet Socialist Republic (now Ukraine), adopting the Ukrainian version of its name, 'Чоп' (usually transliterated as 'Chop' or 'Tchop' in English).

Demographics
According to the Ukrainian national census, Chop had a population in 2001 of 8,919, of whom 40% were Ukrainians, 39.2% ethnic Hungarians and 20.8% Roma, Russians, Slovaks, Belarusians, and Jews.

Features

Chop is an important railway junction in Ukraine where the Lviv-Stryi-Budapest railway line meets the Lviv-Uzhgorod-Košice line.  There is also a line running eastwards to Romania via Korolevo and Halmeu although there are currently no regular passenger services.

Near Chop, there are also international railway and highway border crossings to Hungary and Slovakia and also to the westernmost point of Ukraine. The first town across the border in Slovakia is Čierna nad Tisou while in Hungary, the first city is Záhony.

Notable residents
 András Pándy, serial killer 
 J. Peters, political activist

See also
 Chop railway station
 Chop - Tysa

References

External links

Cities in Zakarpattia Oblast
Cities of regional significance in Ukraine
Slovakia–Ukraine border crossings